Shiva Shrestha (born 18 March 1992) is a Nepali professional footballer. He plays for Manang Marshyangdi Club in Nepal National League as a midfielder. He was called to Nepali internationals at the 2014 FIFA World Cup qualifiers.

Club career 
Shiva Shrestha is a Nepalese midfielder who was born in Pokhara.  After graduating from ANFA Academy, he soon joined the Nepalese powerhouse the Manang Marshyangdi Club and plays with the number eight.

On 20 September 2014 Shrestha  scored the equalizing goal in an AFC President's Cup match against Air Force SC. Manang Marshyangdi though went on to win the match 2-1.

On 17 October 2014 Shrestha was named as stand in captain for MMC in a match against Indian Army XI at the Governor's Gold Cup. Shrestha scored the second goal in a 2-0 victory, taking a pass from Deepak Rai in the second half. In the second stage at the semi-finals Shrestha scored one of two goals in extra time to hand MMC a 3-1 victory over Sikkim FA. MMC lost in the final to ONGC F.C. on penalty kicks.

In the opening match of the 2014–15 Martyr's Memorial A-Division League Shrestha scored the second goal in MMC's 3-0 victory over  Far Western FC.
 
In the group stage match of the 2014 Aaha! Rara Gold Cup Shrestha opened the scoring in the seventh minute in an eventual 7-0 win over Kanchanjunga FC of Sikkim, India.

Despite being 5 feet 7 inches tall Shrestha has scored 15 domestic goals for MMC. He however has never scored for his country.

International career 
Shrestha has so far played 4 international matches with Nepal's Senor Team, including three world cup qualifiers. Shrestha played the two legs against Timor-Leste but after Nepals 9-0 loss to Jordan, he quit the senior national team.

Shrestha still has played a crucial role in Nepal U-23 team especially in the AFC U-22 qualifiers.

Personal life
Shrestha initially considered quitting football and pursuing a career as a Gurkha in the British Army after Nepal's humiliating 9-0 loss to Jordan in the 2014 FIFA World Cup qualifiers. However the change of profession never materialized and Shrestha returned to football a few months later.

References

External links 
 
 

1992 births
Living people
People from Pokhara
Association football midfielders
Nepalese footballers
Nepal international footballers
Manang Marshyangdi Club players